In biochemistry, receptor–ligand kinetics is a branch of chemical kinetics in which the kinetic species are defined by different non-covalent bindings and/or conformations of the molecules involved, which are denoted as receptor(s) and ligand(s). Receptor–ligand binding kinetics also involves the on- and off-rates of binding.

A main goal of receptor–ligand kinetics is to determine the concentrations of the various kinetic species (i.e., the states of the receptor and ligand) at all times, from a given set of initial concentrations and a given set of rate constants.  In a few cases, an analytical solution of the rate equations may be determined, but this is relatively rare.  However, most rate equations can be integrated numerically, or approximately, using the steady-state approximation.  A less ambitious goal is to determine the final equilibrium concentrations of the kinetic species, which is adequate for the interpretation of equilibrium binding data.

A converse goal of receptor–ligand kinetics is to estimate the rate constants and/or dissociation constants of the receptors and ligands from experimental kinetic or equilibrium data.  The total concentrations of receptor and ligands are sometimes varied systematically to estimate these constants.

Binding kinetics 

The binding constant is a special case of the equilibrium constant . It is associated with the binding and unbinding reaction of receptor (R) and ligand (L) molecules, which is formalized as:

{R} + {L} <=> {RL}.

The reaction is characterized by the on-rate constant  and the off-rate constant , which have units of 1/(concentration time) and 1/time, respectively. In equilibrium, the forward binding transition {R} + {L} -> {RL} should be balanced by the backward unbinding transition {RL} -> {R} + {L}. That is,

,

where [{R}], [{L}] and [{RL}] represent the concentration of unbound free receptors, the concentration of unbound free ligand and the concentration of receptor-ligand complexes. The binding constant, or the association constant  is defined by

.

Simplest case: single receptor and single ligand bind to form a complex 

The simplest example of receptor–ligand kinetics is that of a single ligand L binding to a single receptor R to form a single complex C

{R} + {L} <-> {C}

The equilibrium concentrations are related by the dissociation constant Kd

where k1 and k−1 are the forward and backward rate constants, respectively.  The total concentrations of receptor and ligand in the system are constant

Thus, only one concentration of the three ([R], [L] and [C]) is independent; the other two concentrations may be determined from Rtot, Ltot and the independent concentration.

This system is one of the few systems whose kinetics can be determined analytically.  Choosing [R] as the independent concentration and representing the concentrations by italic variables for brevity (e.g.), the kinetic rate equation can be written

Dividing both sides by k1 and introducing the constant 2E = Rtot - Ltot - Kd, the rate equation becomes

where the two equilibrium concentrations  are given by the quadratic formula and  D is defined

However, only the  equilibrium has a positive concentration, corresponding to the equilibrium observed experimentally.

Separation of variables and a partial-fraction expansion yield the integrable ordinary differential equation

whose solution is

or, equivalently,

for association, and

for dissociation, respectively; where the integration constant φ0 is defined

From this solution, the corresponding solutions for the other concentrations  and  can be obtained.

See also 
 Binding potential
 Patlak plot
 Scatchard plot

References

Further reading
 D.A. Lauffenburger and J.J. Linderman (1993) Receptors: Models for Binding, Trafficking, and Signaling, Oxford University Press.  (hardcover) and 0-19-510663-6 (paperback)

Receptors
Chemical kinetics